Engelhartstetten is a town in the district of Gänserndorf in the Austrian state of Lower Austria.

Geography
Engelhartstetten lies near Vienna in the southeast corner of the Marchfeld. On the east is the March River and on the south the Danube. About 12 percent of the municipality is forested.

History
The Battle of Kressenbrunn was fought in July 1260 near Groissenbrunn.

References

Cities and towns in Gänserndorf District
Croatian communities in Austria